Edgar L. Feige (born 19 September 1937) is an emeritus professor of economics at the University of Wisconsin–Madison. A graduate of Columbia University (BA. 1958) and the University of Chicago (Ph.D., 1963) he has taught at Yale University ; The University of Essex; Erasmus University and held the Cleveringa Chair,  at the University of Leiden in 1981–82. He has published widely on such topics as underground and shadow economies; tax evasion; transition economics; financial transaction taxes the Automated Payment Transaction tax (APT tax); and monetary theory and policy. He has consulted with various US and international government agencies.

Selected publications

Books
 The Demand for Liquid Assets, Prentice Hall, 1963;
 The Underground Economies: Tax Evasion and Information Distortion, Cambridge University Press, 1989
 Underground Economies in Transition: Unrecorded Activity, Tax Evasion, Corruption and Organized Crime, Ashgate, 1999.

Academic Articles
 Taxation for the 21st century: The Automated Payment Transaction (APT) Tax, Economic Policy (Journal), October 2000.
Starting Over: The Automated Payment Transaction Tax, Milken Institute Review, 2001.
 Reflections on the Meaning and Measurement of Unobserved Economies: What do we really know about the Shadow Economy?

References 

1937 births
Living people
American economists
University of Wisconsin–Madison faculty
People from Berlin
Academic staff of Leiden University
University of Chicago alumni
Columbia University alumni
German emigrants to the United States